Inverness—Richmond was a federal electoral district in the province of Nova Scotia, Canada, that was represented in the House of Commons of Canada from 1935 to 1968.

This riding was created in 1933 from parts of Inverness and Richmond—West Cape Breton ridings. It consisted of the counties of Inverness and Richmond and  part of the county of Cape Breton (the municipal districts of Bateston (No. 24), Catalone (No. 15), Gabarus (No. 7), Grand Mira (No. 17), Louisburg Parish (No. 6), Main-à-Dieu (No. 5), and Trout Brook (No. 16)), including the town of Louisburg.

It was abolished in 1966 when it was redistributed between Cape Breton Highlands—Canso and Cape Breton—East Richmond ridings.

Members of Parliament

This riding elected the following Members of Parliament:

Election results

See also 

 List of Canadian federal electoral districts
 Past Canadian electoral districts

External links
 Riding history for Inverness—Richmond (1933–1966) from the Library of Parliament

Former federal electoral districts of Nova Scotia